Oxton is a suburb of Birkenhead, Merseyside, England. Administratively it is a ward of the Metropolitan Borough of Wirral. Originally a village in its own right, it became part of the Municipal Borough of Birkenhead upon its creation in 1877. Before local government reorganisation on 1 April 1974, it was part of the County Borough of Birkenhead, within the county of Cheshire.

History
The name Oxa-tún derives from Old Norse, meaning "a farm or enclosure where oxen are kept". By 1278, the name had been adapted into Old English as Oxeton and was recorded as Oxon in 1549.

Oxton was once one of the most affluent areas in England mainly due to its proximity to Liverpool and the fact that along with various other Wirral  locations, it was a favourite residential area for wealthy Liverpool merchants and tradesmen of the time. Oxton Village is a mainly early Victorian era settlement with fine sandstone and brick built houses, many of which now form part of a conservation area designated in April 1979 and administered by the Metropolitan Borough of Wirral. 
Some of these buildings have been designated by English Heritage as Grade II listed.

A significant part of the land on which Oxton is situated was part of the Estate of the Earl of Shrewsbury.  This has been commemorated over the years in many of the road names, which bear the family names and titles of the various Earls: Alton Road, Beresford Road, Chetwynd Road, Ingestre Road, Shrewsbury Road, Talbot Road, Waterford Road and Wexford Road. The oldest pub in Oxton Village is called the Shrewsbury Arms and the bar which is now known as the Oxton Bar and Kitchen was formerly the Talbot Hotel.

Christ Church opened in 1849 and has a Father Willis organ, installed in 1888.

Geography

Location
The Wirral peninsula is formed of Triassic Keuper and Bunter sandstones covered by glacially deposited boulder clay. The historic settlement of Oxon-hill laid to the north-eastern side of the peninsula on the sandstone ridge near to current location of St Saviours Church and the Caernarfon Castle public house

Oxton Village pre-dates the conurbation that developed around Birkenhead, of which it now forms part. It is bordered to the north by Claughton and to the south by Prenton. Birkenhead town centre lies to the east.

Originally an agricultural community, Oxton became a desirable residential location for the middle classes and bourgeoisie as the economy of 19th century Birkenhead and Liverpool grew. The north east of the conservation area, at the junction of Victoria Mount, Rose Mount, Village Road and Claughton Firs developed as a commercial centre with restaurants (including Merseyside's only Michelin starred restaurant), pubs, cafes and shops.

Conservation Area and Oxton Village
Oxton Village Conservation Area was established in 1979 by Wirral Borough Council in order to "preserve and enhance the village's distinctive character". Soon afterwards, a registered charity was founded to promote the Conservation Area; this was named The Oxton Society. This objective of this charity is to work in partnership with the Council, local businesses and the community to pursue this objective.

The approximate boundary is bounded by Shrewsbury Road to the north, Fairview Road to the east, Arno Road to the south and Talbot Road to the west. Irregular in places, the boundary has a number of ‘pockets' encompassing small groups of properties or parts of streets. In 2010 Wirral Council commissioned an appraisal for Oxton Village Conservation Areas that evaluated and analysed various features which gives the conservation area its special architectural and historic interest. The appraisal made recommendations to extend the Conservation Area boundaries of Normanston Road & Derwent Road, Birch Road, Village Road & Wellington Road and Talbot Road, Mill Hill and Ingestre Road. The consultation period for the boundary extensions has now closed and the extensions are in the process of being adopted.

Post town controversy
Owing to a redefining of post towns by the Royal Mail in 2003, Oxton is partially identified as being within Prenton. However, whilst this was only a postal address, in its 22 May 2003 edition, the Liverpool Echo reported that "Jeremy Watson, of the Oxton Society, has called on the Royal Mail to have a ballot"; however, the code at that time did not allow a request to ballot. A similar complaint was made on behalf of Prenton residents when the Royal Mail defined part of Prenton to be within Oxton.

Education
Independent and selective Birkenhead School was exclusively a boys' school from its founding in 1860 until 2000, when its Sixth Form became co-educational. It became fully co-educational in 2008. Birkenhead High School was formerly an independent selective school for girls but became a state-funded all-ability Academy school in 2009. 
Both changes were driven by falling numbers of pupils in the schools as a result of the abolition of the Assisted Places Scheme. Despite this, both schools maintain their place around the top of the Wirral A Level results.

In addition Prenton Preparatory School lies in the heart of the Conservation Area and Oxton St Saviour's is the local primary school. A number of other schools lie just outside the boundary of Oxton, including St. Anselm's College (boys, RC) and Townfield Primary School.

Sport
Oxton Cricket & Sports Club is also located here. Founded in 1875 as Oxton Cricket Club, other sports played at the club include tennis, lacrosse, squash and bowls.

Demographics
At the 2001 Census, the population of Oxton was 14,066, consisting of 6,680 males and 7,386 females.

Some 2005 demographic statistics of area CH43, which encompasses the geographical area of Oxton, Claughton and parts of Bidston and Noctorum, (total CH43 population (2005): 36,443) are:

Governance

Oxton is part of the Birkenhead parliamentary constituency.

Local Councillors
After reorganisation in 2004, Oxton forms an electoral ward of the Metropolitan Borough of Wirral, which had an electorate of 11,237 on 6 May 2010.

2019 local elections
The results of the Local Election Result for Oxton ward on 2 May 2019 were:

https://democracy.wirral.gov.uk/mgElectionAreaResults.aspx?XXR=0&ID=67&RPID=508567813

Notable connections
Sir Leslie Patrick Abercrombie - town planner
Michael Chan - Baron Chan of Oxton in the County of Merseyside
Colonel Philip Toosey - military officer
Cyril Scott - British composer (1879-1970)
Charles Whittle (1921-2001), cricketer
John Hughes, (1903-1977), Olympic gold medal winning architect

Ron Gittins 
In January 2020 the former rented ground-floor flat of local eccentric Ron Gittins was found to contain a treasure trove of Outsider Art produced by Gittins, never previously seen. A crowdfunding appeal was launched to save the work. The property was auctioned on 1 March 2023 and was bought by a mystery benefactor to preserve the artworks. Writing in Epidemiology and Psychiatric Sciences, Lisa Slominski says that "Oscillating between an idiosyncratic subjectivity and universal offering, the power held in Ron's Place is undeniable."

See also
Listed buildings in Oxton, Merseyside

References

Further reading

External links

 Oxton Village Online
 The Oxton Society
 The Oxton Artists
 The Oxton Society: Oxton In History, by John Green (2006) Word document  Acrobat pdf file

Towns and villages in the Metropolitan Borough of Wirral
Birkenhead